The 2019–20 Bangladesh Tri-Nation Series was a cricket tournament that took place in September 2019. It was a tri-nation series between Bangladesh, Afghanistan and Zimbabwe with all the matches played as Twenty20 Internationals (T20Is).

Zimbabwe lost their first three matches of the series, therefore, Bangladesh and Afghanistan progressed to the final. No play was possible in the final due to rain, therefore Bangladesh and Afghanistan shared the trophy.

Background
Originally, the Afghanistan cricket team were scheduled to tour Bangladesh in October 2019 to play one Test and two T20I matches. On 27 June 2019, it was announced that both the Bangladesh Cricket Board (BCB) and the Afghanistan Cricket Board (ACB) decided to replace the bi-lateral series with a tri-nation series, with these two teams joined by Zimbabwe. The tri-series started on 13 September, with the final scheduled to be held on 24 September.

However, in July 2019, the International Cricket Council (ICC) suspended Zimbabwe Cricket, with the team barred from taking part in ICC events. Despite the suspension by the ICC, Zimbabwe Cricket confirmed that they would still participate in the tri-series, as they could still play against other ICC members. The BCB confirmed the schedule for the tour in August 2019.

Following the 2019 Cricket World Cup, where Afghanistan lost all of their matches, Rashid Khan was named as the new captain of the Afghanistan cricket team across all three formats. Zimbabwe's captain, Hamilton Masakadza, retired from international cricket following the conclusion of the tri-series. Following the series, Zimbabwe played in another tri-series, in Singapore.

Squads

Bangladesh added Najmul Hossain Shanto, Rubel Hossain, Aminul Islam, Shafiul Islam and Mohammad Naim for the third and fourth T20Is, while Yeasin Arafat, Mahedi Hasan and Soumya Sarkar were dropped from the squad for the last two T20Is.

Tour match

Twenty-over match: Bangladesh Cricket Board XI vs Zimbabwe

Points table

T20I series

1st T20I

2nd T20I

3rd T20I

4th T20I

5th T20I

6th T20I

Final

References

External links
 Series home at ESPN Cricinfo

2019 in Bangladeshi cricket
2019 in Afghan cricket
2019 in Zimbabwean cricket
International cricket competitions in 2019–20
Afghan cricket tours of Bangladesh
Zimbabwean cricket tours of Bangladesh
Bangladesh Tri-Nation Series